Sodaville is an extinct town in Mineral County, in the U.S. state of Nevada. The GNIS classifies it as a populated place.

History
A variant name was "Soda Springs". A post office called Sodaville was established in 1882, and remained in operation until 1917.

Initially, a railroad station was intended to be at Sodaville, but an agreement between the railroad and land speculators could not be reached, so Mina, Nevada was platted two miles north of Sodaville.

See also
 Thenardite, a sodium sulfate mineral, Na2SO4, found at Sodaville

References

External links
 Sodaville ghost town

Ghost towns in Mineral County, Nevada